Great Britain competed at the 2022 Winter Olympics in Beijing, China, from 4 to 20 February 2022. The Great Britain team consists of 50 athletes (27 men and 23 women). Eve Muirhead and Dave Ryding were the country's flagbearers during the opening ceremony. Meanwhile curler Bruce Mouat was the flagbearer during the closing ceremony.

British athletes won a total of two medals (one gold, one silver). This result was described as a 'disappointment' by UK Sport. Despite the underwhelming games, Great Britain ranked 19th on the medal table, the same ranking as the previous three Winter Olympic Games.

Medal and performance targets
In July 2018, UK Sport announced a preliminary target of 5–12 medals for the Games, which would at least sustain the level of success experienced at the previous two Games, in both of which 5 medals were won. On 13 January 2022, UK Sport confirmed that they have a target of 3–7 medals for the Games.

Summary

The team won two medals (a tally below the 3-7 medal target set by UK Sport) during the course of the Games, both in curling. This is also three medals less than the team achieved at both the 2014 and 2018 Winter Olympics. The women's team, skipped by Eve Muirhead won gold, beating Japan 10-3 in the gold medal game, and the men's team, skipped by Bruce Mouat won silver, having lost the gold medal match to Sweden 5-4 after an extra end. The gold medal from women's curling team ensured Great Britain won at least one gold medal for a fourth consecutive Winter Olympics. However, there was no repeat of the successes of previous Olympic Games in the sliding sports, particularly in skeleton, where Great Britain failed to win a medal - the first time this had happened since skeleton was included as an event. 2018 bronze medallist Laura Deas finished 19th. The team had other high hopes with Charlotte Bankes being one of the favourites to win the Women's Snowboard Cross event, but she was beaten in the quarter finals and finished ninth overall. Izzy Atkin who won a bronze in 2018 in the Women's Ski Slopestyle also dented the team's hopes of further medals, after she withdrew from the games due to injury.

Upside down flag controversy
At the opening of the 2022 Winter Olympics, Eve Muirhead and Dave Ryding were seen waving the flag upside down.

Administration
On 24 May 2020, Team GB announced that former modern pentathlete Georgina Harland would become the first woman to act as Chef de Mission for the British team at an Olympic Games. A bronze medal winner at the 2004 Games in Athens, she went on to serve as a deputy Chef de Mission at both the 2016 and 2020 Summer Games in Rio and Tokyo respectively.

Medallists

The following British competitors won medals at the games. In the by discipline sections below, medallists' names are bolded.

Competitors
The team includes three sets of siblings: Izzy and Zoe Atkin (Freestyle skiing); Leonie and Makayla Gerken Schofield (Freestyle skiing); and Farrell and Niall Treacy (Short track speed skating). Gus Kenworthy (Freestyle skiing) competed for the United States at the 2014 and 2018 Winter Games winning a silver medal at the former. In 2019 he announced that he would seek to represent Great Britain at the 2022 Games. He is a dual national having been born in Chelmsford to a British mother and American father.

Former sprinter Montell Douglas (Bobsleigh) becomes the eighth British athlete to compete at both the Summer and Winter Games. She was preceded by Ethel Muckelt (Figure skating at both Games) and Percy Legard (Modern pentathlon/Nordic combined) in the inter-war period. Like Douglas five other athletes have transferred from athletics to bobsleigh in more recent decades: Colin Campbell; John Herbert; Marcus Adam; Philip Harries; and Allyn Condon. She is the first British woman to compete in different sports at the Summer and Winter Games. Douglas will also be one of two athletes together with Jaqueline Mourão of Brazil to have competed at both Beijing 2008 and 2022.

The following is the list of number of competitors participating at the Games per sport/discipline.

Alpine skiing

Following the qualification period, Great Britain had achieved two quota places in both men's and women's alpine skiing, as a result of which, Great Britain also qualified for the team event. On 21 January 2022, Team GB announced the selection of the four athletes who will represent Great Britain in Beijing led by slalom skier Dave Ryding who will be competing at his fourth Games. On 10 February, Team GB announced that they would not be entering a team in the Mixed Team event.

Bobsleigh

Following the conclusion of the qualification period in Bobsleigh, Great Britain had qualified sleds in the four-man, two-man and two-woman disciplines. Qualification in the two-woman discipline also granted a place in the monobob event. On 20 January 2022, Team GB announced the selection of eight athletes including two reserves to compete in Beijing. The squad was led by drivers Brad Hall (men's two and four-man bobsleigh) and Mica McNeill (women's monobob and two-woman bobsleigh). In the two-man event, Hall and Nick Gleeson crashed during their third run and eventually finished the event in 11th position.

* – Denotes the driver of each sled 
Ben Simons and Adele Nicoll were travelling reserves

Cross-country skiing

By meeting the basic qualification standards, Great Britain has qualified at least one male cross-country skier. Following the end of the qualification process, Great Britain had accepted three quota places, all in the men's events. On 22 January 2022, Team GB announced the names of the three athletes who will compete in the cross country events in Beijing. Andrew Musgrave and Andrew Young will both be competing at their fourth Games.

Distance

Sprint

Curling

Outside of the Olympic Games, Great Britain competes under the flags of its constituent home nations, Scotland, England and Wales (Northern Irish players compete for a combined Ireland); Scotland results are treated as Great Britain for the purposes of Olympic qualification.

Summary

Men's tournament

Great Britain has qualified their men's team (five athletes), by finishing in the top six teams in the 2021 World Men's Curling Championship. On 14 October 2021, the British Olympic Association announced that Team Bruce Mouat would be their men's team representatives.

Round robin
Great Britain had a bye in draws 1, 5 and 9.

Draw 2
Thursday, 10 February, 14:05

Draw 3
Friday, 11 February, 9:05

Draw 4
Friday, 11 February, 20:05

Draw 6
Sunday, 13 February, 9:05

Draw 7
Sunday, 13 February, 20:05

Draw 8
Monday, 14 February, 14:05

Draw 10
Tuesday, 15 February, 20:05

Draw 11
Wednesday, 16 February, 14:05

Draw 12
Thursday, 17 February, 9:05

Semifinal
Thursday, 17 February, 20:05

Gold medal game
Saturday, 19 February, 14:50

Women's tournament

Great Britain has qualified their women's team (five athletes), by finishing first in the round robin in the 2021 Olympic Qualification Event. On 23 December 2021, the British Olympic Association officially named Eve Muirhead, Vicky Wright, Jennifer Dodds, Hailey Duff and Mili Smith to the women's team following a nine-player squad for five events at the beginning of the 2021–22 curling season.

Round robin
Great Britain had a bye in draws 4, 7 and 11.

Draw 1
Thursday, 10 February, 9:05

Draw 2
Thursday, 10 February, 20:05

Draw 3
Friday, 11 February, 14:05

Draw 5
Saturday, 12 February, 20:05

Draw 6
Sunday, 13 February, 14:05

Draw 8
Monday, 14 February, 20:05

Draw 9
Tuesday, 15 February, 14:05

Draw 10
Wednesday, 16 February, 9:05

Draw 12
Thursday, 17 February, 14:05

Semifinal
Friday, 18 February, 20:05

Gold medal game
Sunday, 20 February, 9:05

Mixed doubles tournament

Great Britain has qualified their mixed doubles team (two athletes), by finishing in the top seven teams in the 2021 World Mixed Doubles Curling Championship. On 14 October 2021, the British Olympic Association announced that reigning world champions Jennifer Dodds and Bruce Mouat would be their mixed doubles representatives.

Round robin
Great Britain had a bye in draws 3, 5 and 7 and will have a further bye in draw 11.

Draw 1
Wednesday, 2 February, 20:05

Draw 2
Thursday, 3 February, 9:05

Draw 4
Thursday, 3 February, 20:05

Draw 6
Friday, 4 February, 13:35

Draw 8
Saturday, 5 February, 14:05

Draw 9
Saturday, 5 February, 20:05

Draw 10
Sunday, 6 February, 9:05

Draw 12
Sunday, 6 February, 20:05

Draw 13
Monday, 7 February, 9:05

Semifinal
Monday, 7 February, 20:05

Bronze medal match

Figure skating

Great Britain secured quotas in both the Ladies' Individual and the Ice Dance events at the 2021 World Figure Skating Championships in Stockholm. On 16 December, Team GB confirmed the selection of Lilah Fear and Lewis Gibson to compete in the ice dancing competition with Natasha McKay joining them in the women's individual event.

Freestyle skiing

On 22 January 2022, Team GB announced the selection of a squad of eleven freestyle skiers to compete in Beijing. They include 2018 bronze medallist Izzy Atkin and Gus Kenworthy who formerly competed for the United States but is eligible for selection by virtue of his British-born mother.

Aerials

Freeski
Men
James Woods did not compete in the slopestyle event due to a back injury.

Women
Izzy Atkin who had qualified to compete in both the big air and slopestyle events was forced to withdraw due to injury.

Moguls

Makayla Gerken Schofield became the first British moguls skier to reach an Olympic final, and her final 8th place finish was also the best ever achieved by a British skier.

Ski cross

Qualification legend: FA – Qualify to medal round; FB – Qualify to consolation round

Luge

Great Britain secured one quota in the men's individual event and on 14 January 2022, Team GB announced the selection of Rupert Staudinger.

Short track speed skating

Great Britain secured quotas for two men and one woman across five events in Short track speed skating after their performance in the 2021–22 ISU Short Track Speed Skating World Cup. On 20 December 2021, Team GB confirmed the selection of Kathryn Thomson and siblings Farrell and Niall Treacy to compete in Beijing.

Qualification Legend: FA = Qualify to final (medal); ADVA = Advanced to medal final on referee decision; FB = Qualify to final (consolation); Q = Qualify to next round on position in heat; q = Qualify to next round on time in field

Skeleton

Following the conclusion of the qualification period in Skeleton, Great Britain had qualified 2 sleds each in the men's and women's disciplines. On 19 January, Team GB announced the selection of the four sliders who will represent the country in Beijing led by 2018 bronze medallist Laura Deas.

Snowboarding

Great Britain qualified three snowboarders for Beijing and their selection was confirmed on 22 January 2022. The squad includes reigning snowboard cross world champion Charlotte Bankes.

Freestyle

Snowboard cross

Qualification legend: Q - Qualify to next round; FA - Qualify to medal final; FB - Qualify to consolation final

Speed skating

On 4 January 2022, Team GB announced that Cornelius Kersten had been selected to represent his country in the men's 1000 and 1500m events. He will be Great Britain's first Olympic representative in the sport since 1992. On 24 January, Ellia Smeding was confirmed as Great Britain's first female speed skater since 1980.

See also
Great Britain at the Olympics
Great Britain at the 2022 Winter Paralympics

References

Nations at the 2022 Winter Olympics
2022
Winter Olympics